Pasir Gudang United FC is a Malaysian football club based in Pasir Gudang, Johor. They play in the 4th level of Malaysian football, the Johor FA State League. Their home stadium is the JCorp Stadium, Pasir Gudang, Johor. The club represents the Pihak Berkuasa Tempatan Pasir Gudang (PBTPG), which is the Pasir Gudang Local Authority.

History
The team qualified for the Malaysia Premier League 2006-07 after winning Malaysia FAM Cup 2005–06, beating ATM FA 3–0 in the final. But they never played a single game in Malaysia Premier League 2006-07. Because of request from Johor FA to merge this two clubs to form stronger teams to compete in the league. Usually, winner of Malaysia FAM Cup automatically get promoted to Malaysia Premier League.

References 

Defunct football clubs in Malaysia
Pasir Gudang
Sport in Johor